HMS Caister Castle was one of 44 s built for the Royal Navy during World War II.

Design and description
The Castle-class corvette was a stretched version of the preceding Flower class, enlarged to improve seakeeping and to accommodate modern weapons. They were powered by a pair of triple-expansion steam engines, each driving one propeller shaft using steam provided by two Admiralty three-drum boilers. The ships' complement was 99 officers and ratings.

The Castle-class ships were equipped with a single QF  Mk XVI gun forward, but their primary weapon was their single three-barrel Squid anti-submarine mortar. This was backed up by one depth charge rail and two throwers for 15 depth charges. The ships were fitted with two twin and a pair of single mounts for  Oerlikon light AA guns. Provision was made for a further four single mounts if needed. They were equipped with Type 145Q and Type 147B ASDIC sets to detect submarines by reflections from sound waves beamed into the water. A Type 277 search radar and a HF/DF radio direction finder rounded out the Castles' sensor suite.

Construction and career
Caistor Castle was laid down by John Lewis & Sons at their shipyard in Aberdeen on 26 August 1943 and launched on 22 May 1944. She was completed on 29 September and served as a convoy escort until the end of the war in May 1945. After the war, Caistor Castle was in reserve at Devonport from 1947 until 1948. She represented the Reserve Fleet at the 1953 Coronation Review and served in the Second Training Squadron at Portland from February 1953 until 1955. Caistor Castle was then placed in reserve at Devonport before being sold for scrap to Arnott Young in 1956; the ship arrived at Dalmuir in March to be broken up.

References

Bibliography
 
 
 
 
 

 

Castle-class corvettes
1944 ships